The following is a list of current American Hockey League (AHL) arenas:

References 

 
arenas